Canal 6 is a Nicaraguan terrestrial television channel broadcasting from the city of Managua. The station claims to be owned by the Government of Nicaragua, but is actually owned by a joint stock company called NEPISA (Negocios Publicitarios Internacionales)

History

Canal 6 started broadcasting on January 17, 1957, as Nicaragua's second television channel, after channel 8 that signed on the year before. It was owned by Salvadora Debayle de Somoza and Lilliam Somoza de Sevilla, daughter of the then president Anastasio Somoza Garcia. In 1962, its programming was seen on channel 8 after a decision to merge the two extant channels.

When the Sandinistas overthrow the Somoza regime in Nicaragua in 1979, Canal 6 was nationalized and became part of the state owned Sistema Sandinista de Televisión.

With Violeta Chamorro's triumph in the 1990 elections, Canal 6 became part of the rebranded state television network SNTV until 1997 when it was legally declared in bankruptcy under Arnoldo Alemán's government.

A fraud involving involving detouring of money erupted in March 2002, before the channel shut down. An audit followed in April.

A new project was announced for the frequency in September 2006, this time the aim was to be an educational channel.

Canal 6 was restored by the Government. Weeks before its resumption, the building was cleaned, as it had outdated equipment and was set to be among the officialist television channels. Orlando Castillo, executive president of Telcor, confirmed the comeback on September 6, whose programming was still yet to be defined by the government. It then resumed operations on September 14, 2011, after investing in its redevelopment since 2008.

Upon its resumption, Canal 6 broadcast a varied schedule, including cartoons from the 80s (when it was part of the SSTV network), musical programming and news flashes about the presidential campaign of Daniel Ortega throughout the day, as well as relays from Telesur and RT's Spanish service.

In November 2019, Canal 6 started managing a second channel, occupying the terrestrial signal of the former 100% Noticias with a secondary channel, Canal 15, carrying educational and cultural programming.

References

External links
Official website

Television stations in Nicaragua
Spanish-language television stations
Television channels and stations established in 1957
Television channels and stations disestablished in 2002
Television channels and stations established in 2011